RTIOX-276 is an orexin antagonist. RTIOX-276 binds selectively to the orexin 1 receptor (KE = 8.5nM) and lacks significant affinity for the orexin 2 receptor (KE = > 10,000nM). RTIOX-276 may have therapeutic utility for the treatment of cocaine addiction. In conditioned place preference studies, RTIOX-276 attenuated the development of place preference in mice exposed to cocaine.

References

Amides
Benzylisoquinolines
Orexin antagonists
3-Pyridyl compounds